Mawouna Kodjo Amevor (born 16 December 1991) is a professional footballer who plays as a centre back for FC Eindhoven. Born in the Netherlands, Amevor represents the Togo national team.

Club career
He made his league debut for FC Dordrecht during the 2010–2011 season and has also played for Go Ahead Eagles, before moving abroad to join English League 2 side Notts County in 2015. He returned to Dordrecht in summer 2016.

In 2018, Amevor signed with Moroccan club Chabab Rif Al Hoceima. He soon left that club and moved to Chonburi in Thailand in November 2018 for the 2019 season. Making no appearances for that club, he signed with Indonesian club Persela Lamongan in late April 2019. Amevor left there in the summer of 2019. 

On 20 January 2020, Amevor signed a contract with FC Eindhoven after a successful trial period and made his debut a day later against FC Utrecht in a KNVB Cup match.

International career
He received his first international call with Togo in October 2014.

References

External links
 
 Voetbal International profile 
 
 

1991 births
Living people
Footballers from Rotterdam
Association football defenders
Citizens of Togo through descent
Togolese footballers
Togo international footballers
Dutch footballers
Dutch people of Togolese descent
Togolese expatriate footballers
RKSV Leonidas players
FC Dordrecht players
Go Ahead Eagles players
Notts County F.C. players
Chabab Rif Al Hoceima players
Mawouna Amevor
Persela Lamongan players
FC Eindhoven players
Eerste Divisie players
Eredivisie players
English Football League players
Expatriate footballers in England
Expatriate footballers in Morocco
Expatriate footballers in Thailand
Expatriate footballers in Indonesia
Togolese expatriate sportspeople in England
Togolese expatriate sportspeople in Morocco
Togolese expatriate sportspeople in Thailand